"Ten Crack Commandments" is a song by American rapper The Notorious B.I.G. on disc two of his final studio album, Life After Death. It was written by B.I.G. (credited under his legal name, Christopher Wallace) along with producer DJ Premier. 

In March 2017, Faith Evans released the single "The Ten Wife Commandments" as the fourth single from her duet album with the rapper The King & I. Lin-Manuel Miranda paid homage with the song "Ten Duel Commandments" in his hit musical Hamilton. The Swedish underground hip hop group The Keffat Liv paid homage with the song "10 Barn Commandments" from their album Vassego o skölj.

Background
The song is a step-by-step guide to achieving success as a drug-dealer. Biggie, purportedly, was inspired by an article penned by Khary Kimani Turner (under the pseudonym KT) in the hip hop magazine The Source. The July 1994 article, entitled "On the Rocks: From 1984 to 1994, Ten Years of Crack", included a sidebar, "A Crack Dealer's Ten Crack Commandments" that outlines ten critical rules to help dealers survive and thrive in the drug business.

The crack epidemic of the early 1980s and the early 1990s was the flood of crack cocaine usage in urban communities across the United States. Beginning around the same time as hip hop music became the sound of these same urban areas, the manifestations of the crack epidemic became a key theme in hip hop music.

The relationship between drugs and hip hop music can be mapped onto the politics of drug use in urban communities during the epidemic. A lack of economic opportunity forced urbanites to turn to selling drugs and other illicit forms of employment to make ends meet and provide for their families. The war on drugs sought to quell the incredible impact that drugs had on the United States and the increase in violent crime nationwide.

These two factors encouraged both The Source and rappers to discuss drug-dealing in the way that promoted physical and fiscal security without discouraging dealers to stop selling drugs.

Composition
"Ten Crack Commandments" does not follow the typical constructs of a hip hop or pop song. It contains no chorus and abandons the typical 16-bar construction of a rap verse. Instead, the song presents the lyrics in a list and offers a short, witty explanation of each. Bracketing this list are an intro and outro that outline Biggie's credentials for sharing the list and explore what might happen if the listener does not abide by these rules.

The song also includes samples from "Shut 'Em Down" by Public Enemy , Countdown by Keith Murray and "Vallarta" by Les McCann and interpolates the structure of the Ten Commandments.

The Ten Crack Commandments
 Never let anyone know how much money you have.
 Never let anyone know your next move.
 Never trust anyone.
 Never use what you sell.
 Never sell where you live.
 Never take credit.
 Keep your family and business completely separated.
 Never keep any crack on you.
 If you aren't being arrested, stay away from police.
 Consignment is strictly for live men.

Reception 
"Ten Crack Commandments" is widely considered to be one of Biggie's greatest works. Billboard ranked the song number nine on their list of the 25 greatest Notorious B.I.G. songs, The Guardian ranked the song number five on their list of the 20 greatest Notorious B.I.G. songs, and Rolling Stone ranked the song number four on their list of the 50 greatest Notorious B.I.G. songs.

On their list of the 25 best songs about selling drugs, Complex rated the song number one.

References

Sources 
 
 
 

1997 songs
The Notorious B.I.G. songs
Song recordings produced by DJ Premier
Songs about drugs
Songs written by the Notorious B.I.G.
Songs written by DJ Premier